Admiral Lord Edward Russell,  (24 April 1805 – 21 May 1887) was a British naval officer and Whig politician.

Early life
He was the son of John Russell, 6th Duke of Bedford, and his second wife Lady Georgina Gordon, and was the younger half-brother of future Prime Minister John Russell.

Career
Russell gained the rank of midshipman in 1819 in the service of the Royal Navy. He gained the rank of lieutenant in 1826. He fought in the Battle of Navarino in 1827, the victory over the Turks.  He gained the rank of commander in 1828. He gained the rank of captain in 1833.

He was elected unopposed as Member of Parliament (MP) for Tavistock at the 1841 general election, but did not stand again in 1847. He held the office of Naval Aide-de-Camp to HM Queen Victoria between 1846 and 1850.  He was invested as a Companion of the Order of the Bath in 1855.  He gained the rank of rear-admiral in 1856.  He gained the rank of vice-admiral in 1863. He gained the rank of admiral in 1867.

He died in 1887, aged 82, and is buried in Brompton Cemetery, London.

Personal life
He married Mary Ann Taylor on 8 February 1860.  They did not have any children. She died in 1874.

Ancestry

See also

References

External links
 
 Thepeerage.com

1805 births
1887 deaths
Burials at Brompton Cemetery
Royal Navy admirals
Edward
Companions of the Order of the Bath
Whig (British political party) MPs
Members of the Parliament of the United Kingdom for Tavistock
UK MPs 1841–1847
Younger sons of dukes
Royal Navy personnel of the Crimean War
British military personnel of the Greek War of Independence